The Haliburton Sculpture Forest is an outdoor collection of sculptures located in Glebe Park near the village of Haliburton, Ontario, Canada. It is operated by the non-profit organization Haliburton Sculpture Forest et al.

Exhibits 
Opened in 2001, the forest has on display 38 sculptures by Canadian, Indigenous, and international artists. The sculptures are arranged along a series of trails in a maple forest on the shores of Haliburton's Head Lake.  The Sculpture Forest is located in Glebe Park, hear Halliburton adjacent to Fleming College's Haliburton School of the Arts.

Facilities include tours, parking, picnic tables, ski and snowshoe trails; entrance is free.

Community partners

Partners and sponsors include: Fleming College, Haliburton Campus, the Haliburton County Development Corporation, the Municipality of Dysart et al, Haliburton Highlands Secondary School, Haliburton Highlands Museum, Haliburton Highlands Trails and Tours Network, Haliburton Nordic Trails Association, Head Lake Trail Committee, Glebe Park Committee, and the Arts Council of Haliburton Highlands, in addition to community volunteers.

References

External links
Official website

Art museums established in 2001
Art museums and galleries in Ontario
Parks in Ontario
Sculpture gardens, trails and parks in Canada
Geography of Haliburton County
Buildings and structures in Haliburton County
Tourist attractions in Haliburton County
Outdoor sculptures in Canada
2001 establishments in Ontario